Abax parallelepipedus is a species of ground beetle native to Europe and the Nearctic. In Europe, it is found in Austria, Belgium, Bosnia and Herzegovina, Bulgaria, Croatia, the Czech Republic, mainland Denmark, Estonia, mainland France, Germany, Great Britain, Hungary, mainland Italy, Kaliningrad, Latvia (doubtful), Liechtenstein, Luxembourg, Moldova, mainland Norway, Poland, central and southern Russia, Slovakia, Slovenia, mainland Spain, Sweden, Switzerland, the Netherlands, Ukraine and Yugoslavia.

References

External links

Abax parallelepipedus at Fauna Europaea
Global Biodiversity Information Facility

Pterostichinae
Beetles described in 1783